Rodionovsky is a rural locality (a khutor) in Kumylzhenskoye Rural Settlement, Kumylzhensky District, Volgograd Oblast, Russia. The population was 235 as of 2010. There are 6 streets.

Geography 
Rodionovsky is located between Lyalinsky and Chunosovsky, on the bank of the Kumylga River, 10 km north of Kumylzhenskaya (the district's administrative centre) by road. Lyalinsky is the nearest rural locality.

References 

Rural localities in Kumylzhensky District